The men's road time trial cycling event at the 2019 European Games in Minsk took place over a distance of 28.6 km on 25 June.

Results

References

Men's road time trial